Trayvon Lathan (born May 16, 1984) is an American professional basketball player who currently plays for the Tijuana Zonkeys of the Liga Nacional de Baloncesto Profesional (LNBP). He played college basketball at Chowan University and went on to become an NBL Canada All-Star with the Moncton Miracles of the National Basketball League of Canada (NBL). Lathan is a native of Chesapeake, Virginia and attended Deep Creek High School in the same area.

References

External links 
 LatinBasket profile
 FIBA profile
 Trayvon Lathan at RealGM

1984 births
Living people
American expatriate basketball people in Canada
American expatriate basketball people in Germany
American expatriate basketball people in Lebanon
American expatriate basketball people in Mexico
American men's basketball players
Basketball players from Virginia
Chowan Hawks men's basketball players
Halifax Rainmen players
Moncton Miracles players
Small forwards
Sportspeople from Chesapeake, Virginia
Tijuana Zonkeys players